The 2006 Oregon Ducks football team represented the University of Oregon in the 2006 NCAA Division I FBS football season. The team was coached by Mike Bellotti and played their home games in Autzen Stadium in Eugene, Oregon.

The Ducks started the season ranked 21 in the Associated Press poll, and won their first game against Stanford in Autzen Stadium by a score of 48–10. Dennis Dixon was the quarterback for the Ducks during the season with Jonathan Stewart as his primary running back. The Ducks finished off the season 7–6 (4–5 Pac-10) and got picked for the 2006 Las Vegas Bowl against BYU.

Before the season

Recruiting

Schedule

Rankings

Roster

Coaching staff

Game summaries

Oregon 48, Stanford 10

In their first game of the year, the Ducks routed Stanford 48–10. Jonathan Stewart had two touchdowns and 168 yards rushing in the game, although he was forced out due to an ankle sprain. Oregon and Stanford exchanged field goals in the first quarter, before Stewart's first touchdown run gave the Ducks a 10–3 lead with 13:36 left in the second. A 15-yard touchdown pass from Dennis Dixon to Jaison Williams extended Oregon's lead to 17–3. The Cardinal responded with a 26-yard touchdown pass by Trent Edwards, but the Ducks scored 10 points in the half's final 3:19, including Stewart's second touchdown run of the game. At halftime, Oregon held a 27–10 lead.

The only score of the third quarter was made by Dixon, who ran for two yards and a touchdown midway through the quarter to stretch the Oregon lead to 24 points. Following a missed field goal attempt by Stanford, Jeremiah Johnson had a three-yard touchdown run to give the Ducks a 41–10 lead in the fourth quarter. The scoring was concluded by Oregon's A. J. Tuitele, who picked up a blocked Stanford field goal attempt and ran for a 72-yard touchdown. A total of 58,450 people attended the game at Autzen Stadium; this was the fourth-most ever and the biggest crowd for a season-opening game.

Oregon 31, Fresno State 24

The No. 20-ranked Ducks won in a tight contest at Fresno State, 31–24. At halftime, Oregon held a 17–10 lead, but on its first possession of the second half Fresno State scored a game-tying touchdown. Later in the third quarter, Oregon drove down the field and attempted a 36-yard field goal. The kick was blocked by Fresno State's Bear Pascoe, but a Bulldog went to pick up the ball instead of leaving it, which would have resulted in a turnover. He was unable to field it, and the Ducks recovered at the Fresno State five-yard line. Oregon scored on the next play through a Jeremiah Johnson run; it was his second touchdown run of the game.

Fresno State responded in the fourth quarter with another game-tying drive, which featured a 40-yard Dwayne Wright rush. Tom Brandstater scored from one yard out to force a 24–24 tie. Oregon drove down the field, but was kept out of the end zone on a third-and-goal play, apparently forcing the Ducks to settle for a field goal. However, they ran a trick play; Brady Leaf, the holder on kicks, took off running and pitched the ball to kicker Paul Martinez, who ran four yards for what turned out to be the game-winning touchdown.

This was Belotti's 92nd win as Ducks head coach, vaulting him past his former boss, Rich Brooks, to become the winningest coach in school history.

Oregon 34, Oklahoma 33

Source: 
    
    
    
    
    
    
    
    
    
    
    
    
    

 
Oregon, after a 16-yard TD by Dennis Dixon, trailed the Sooners 33–27 with 1:12 left. After a botched onside kick attempt which both teams claimed to recover the ruling on the field was to give Oregon the ball.  Oklahoma claimed that the ball had made contact with an Oregon player before it went 10 yards (necessary on an onside kick), so the ball should still be theirs. The play was reviewed by Pac-10 replay official Gordon Riese. The angle Riese used did not clearly show the contact but did show that Oregon had not actually recovered the ball.  Because this was not the challenge on the field, the call was not reversed. A 23-yard touchdown pass by Dixon with 46 seconds left gave Oregon a 34–33 lead. A squib kick was recovered by Oklahoma's Reggie Smith for 55 yards, setting Garrett Hartley up for a 44-yard field goal attempt. The kick was blocked by Oregon, clinching the Ducks' 34–33 win. Dixon had 341 passing yards and two touchdown passes, in addition to running for a touchdown.

Oregon 51, Arizona State 13

The Ducks scored two touchdowns in the first quarter to take an early 14–0 lead. Following an Arizona State field goal midway through the second quarter, Oregon scored 10 points in the final 3:46 of the first half for a 24–3 halftime lead. At the start of the third quarter, Jeremiah Johnson's 4-yard touchdown was quickly answered by a kickoff return for a touchdown by Terry Richardson. Finally in the fourth, the Ducks scored 17 unanswered points to close the game with a 48–13 margin of victory.

Oregon 24, California 45

In their fifth game of the season, the Ducks, ranked 11th, suffered their first loss against 16th-ranked California. Following an interception of a Dennis Dixon pass by Brandon Hampton during the first possession of the game, the Golden Bears scored a touchdown to take an early 7–0 lead. California stretched its lead to 14–3 by the end of the first quarter and added two more touchdowns in the second quarter for a 28–3 lead. With 1:04 left in the first half, the Ducks scored their first touchdown of the game, having successfully faked a field goal attempt earlier in the drive. The Golden Bears scored the first 10 points of the third quarter, extending their lead to 28 points. Dixon threw two touchdown passes in the final 15:20 of the game, but the Golden Bears finished with a 45–24 win. For California, DeSean Jackson caught a touchdown pass and returned a punt for another touchdown. Dixon threw three interceptions in the game for Oregon, and Jonathan Stewart was held to 25 yards rushing, though he did score a touchdown.

UCLA

This game was one of firsts. It was the first win in Autzen Stadium against UCLA since 2000. Oregon's 20-point lead in the first quarter marked the first points UCLA had given up in the first quarter this entire season.

Both teams held a record of 4 wins, 1 loss at the time of the game.

In the first quarter, Oregon scored 3 touchdowns and UCLA scored one field goal. In the second quarter, UCLA's Justin Medlock scored a field goal, bringing UCLA's score to 6 points. In the third quarter, James Finley scored a touchdown for Oregon, bringing their score to 27 points. In the fourth quarter, UCLA'S Kahil Bell scored two touchdowns and Oregon's Matt Everson also scored a touchdown. The final score was 30–20, a win for Oregon.

Throughout this season, UCLA had only allowed 50 yds defensively a game. In this game, Oregon ran 256 yds.

Both teams suffered 8 penalties, but Oregon gave up only 56yds in contrast to UCLA, who gave up 91yds.

The leading player for Oregon was Dennis Dixon who scored two touchdowns, completed 10 of the 17 passes, and ran 144 yds.

Washington State

Portland State

Washington

USC

The game was the first time the Oregon Ducks had played at the Los Angeles Coliseum since the 2000 season when Paul Hackett was still USC's coach. The game was USC's homecoming game.

In the first quarter, neither team scored any points. In the second quarter, USC scored 2 touchdowns, one by C. J. Gable and the other by Chauncey Washington, for a total of 14 points. In the third quarter, Oregon earned 3 points via a field goal by Paul Martinez. USC earned 2 additional touchdowns, bringing their total to 28 points. Both these touchdowns were also made by Chauncey Washington. In the fourth quarter, Oregon scored their first and only touchdown of the game, bringing their final score to 10 points. This touchdown was scored by Jonathan Stewart. USC earned a final touchdown via Dwayne Jarrett, bringing the Trojans' final score to 35. The game ended with a final score of 35–10.

Arizona

Oregon State

Postseason

BYU

Oregon's final game of the season took place in Sam Boyd Stadium in Las Vegas, NV since it was a bowl game. The 2006 Las Vegas Bowl matched the Ducks against BYU.

This game marked BYU's first bowl win in 10 years since the 1996 football season. BYU ended their season with 11 wins and 2 losses.

BYU had over twice the number of total yards, 548 yds, to Oregon's 260 yds.

In the first quarter, neither team scored. In the second quarter, BYU's Jared McLaughlin had a 24yd FG; 2 touchdowns were also scored by BYU's Curtis Brown and Jonny Harline respectively. Curtis Brown scored his second touchdown of the night, bringing BYU's total score to 24 points by the end of the third quarter. Oregon scored their first and only touchdown of the night in the fourth quarter, resulting in a total score of 8 points. In the fourth quarter, BYU earned 2 additional touchdowns bringing their final score to 38 points.

The leading performers for BYU were Jonny Harline and John Beck.

References

Oregon
Oregon Ducks football seasons
Oregon Ducks football